China competed in the 2006 Asian Games held in Doha, Qatar from December 1, 2006 to December 15, 2006. The team is composed of athletes from mainland China only – each of China's two special administrative regions had its own team (with the designations 'Hong Kong, China' and 'Macau, China', respectively). China topped the medal tally with 166 gold medals.

Participation details

Boxing

China was represented by 10 amateur boxing athletes competing for the 11 gold medals at stake in this edition of the Asiad. Half of the entry list qualified for the semifinal bouts.

Entry list

 Bantamweight - GU Yu
 Light Flyweight - HU Qing
 Heavyweight - LI Bin
 Welterweight - SILAMU Hanati
 Light Welterweight - XIA Wenjie

 Featherweight - XIE Long Wang
 Flyweight - YANG Bo
 Middleweight - ZHANG Jianting
 Light Heavyweight - ZHANG Xiaoping
 Light Flyweight - ZOU Shimming

Standings

Results
Venue: ASPIRE Hall 5

Legend:
PTS - Points, RSCOS - Referee Stop Contest Outscored, R - Round

See also
 China at the Asian Games
 China at the Olympics
 Sports in China

References

Nations at the 2006 Asian Games
2006
Asian Games